The 2011 Torneo Descentralizado de Fútbol Profesional (known as the 2011 Copa Movistar for sponsorship reasons) was the ninety-fifth season of Association Peruvian football. A total of 16 teams competed in the tournament, with Universidad de San Martín as the defending champion. The Torneo Descentralizado began on 12 February and concluded on 14 December with the victory of Juan Aurich over Alianza Lima in the penalty kicks of the final Play-off, giving Juan Aurich its debut Peruvian title.

Competition modus
The sixteen teams played a round-robin home-and-away round for a total of 30 matches each. The teams that finish in first and second place played in the Play-off to determine the season champion. The teams that place fifteenth and sixteenth were relegated. The Torneo de Promoción y Reserva was played alongside the Descentralizado with the reserve teams of each first division team. The champion of the reserve competition will award its senior team 2 points while the runner-up will award 1 point. Between the fifteenth and sixteenth round, there was a two-month recess for the Peru national football team's participation in the 2011 Copa América. During the recess, the Torneo Intermedio knock-out competition was played. In this competition all sixteen first division teams in addition to some Segunda División teams and amateur teams competed. All international competition berths were distributed via the league table with the first three teams qualifying to the Copa Libertadores and the subsequent three teams qualifying to the Copa Sudamericana.

Teams
José Gálvez and Total Chalaco finished the 2010 season in 15th and 16th place, respectively, in the aggregate table and thus were relegated to the Segunda División. They were replaced by the champion of the 2010 Segunda División, Cobresol and the champion of the 2010 Copa Perú, Unión Comercio.

Managerial changes

Standings

Results

Play-off
The finals (also known as the Play-off) of the 2011 season were played between the two best placed teams of the league table. The club with the most points on the aggregate table choose which leg they play as the home team. They also choose the venue of the third match in case both teams are tied on points after the second leg. The first leg was played on 8 December and the second leg on 11 December.

Tied 2–2 on aggregate. Juan Aurich won 3–1 on penalties.

Top goalscorers

Source: ADFP.org.pe
Last updated: To games played in Round 30

References

External links
Peruvian Football League News 

2011
1